"747" is a song by Swedish alternative rock band Kent. It's the final song on their album Isola and was released as third single in July 1998 with B-sides "Din skugga" and "Elever". It's been recorded both with Swedish and English lyrics. It quickly became a fan favorite, and for eight years, the band always ended their concerts with it.

Name, lyrics and theme
In its album version, the song is 7 minutes and 47 seconds long, almost half of that as an instrumental outro with characteristic guitar riffs and keyboard melodies. The title is not to be found in the song, and is not a reference to the Boeing 747 airplane even though the lyrics are flight-inspired: the Swedish original, which is slightly different from the English release, describes the narrator and an unidentified second character leaving or escaping something, towards an unknown destination, on a passenger airliner. It closes with a crash scene, moving into the instrumental outro:

listening
tense & strapped in
& when panic erupts
you smile faintly
and whisper to me you
are worth dying for
but against rubber, glass & metal
a miracle means nothing at all

The cover image of the Isola album is an aircraft (in fact, a Boeing 737) which was also used as a backdrop in ensuing concerts. The album name itself is supposed to symbolize New York City, referencing "Isola" in Ed McBain's crime novels.

Video
A music video was recorded for the English version. In it, the band is playing on a stage with a picture of an airplane as a backdrop. At the same time, a story is played up about a man who attempts to steal the mysterious contents of a briefcase, but ends up abandoned at an airport.

Versions
 Swedish album version (7:47)
 Swedish single version (4:25)
 Swedish Nåid 2000 remix (4:31)
 English album version (7:47)
 English single version (4:17) - Video recorded

The single versions have a shorter outro but contain a chorus which the album versions lack.

Track listings

Swedish 4-track single
 "747" (Swedish single version) (4:25)
 "Elever" (4:46)
 "Din Skugga" (4:06)
 "747" (Swedish album version) (7:47)

The songs "Elever" and "Din Skugga" were later re-released on the B-Sidor 95-00 album.

Swedish 2-track single
 "747" (Swedish single version) (4:25)
 "747" (Swedish album version) (7:47)

UK Release
 "747" (English Radio Version) (4:17)
 "Unprofessional" (Live Radio Session — Recorded for 2 Meter Sessions, 22-5-98) (4:45)
 "What It Feels Like" (2:41)

UK Promo
 747 (Radio version)

US Promo CD
 Radio edit (4:14)
 Swedish version radio edit (4:25)
 Album version (7:47)
 Suggested callout hook #1 (0:09)
 Suggested callout hook #2 (0:09)

Charts

Swedish version

English version

References

Kent (band) songs
1998 songs
1998 singles
Songs written by Joakim Berg
RCA Victor singles